Sherman Zwicker is a wooden auxiliary fishing schooner built in 1942 at the Smith and Rhuland shipyard, Lunenburg, Nova Scotia. Influenced by the design of the famous Bluenose, Sherman Zwicker was built to fish the Grand Banks. The schooner was built for F. Homer Zwicker of Zwicker and Co. Officially christened in 1942, the F/V Sherman Zwicker is the last operable saltbank fishing vessel in existence.

Description

Sherman Zwicker is a  wooden auxiliary fishing schooner. She was designed with a schooner hull similar to her famous sister ship Bluenose, but with a  diesel engine installed from the beginning. Both Sherman Zwicker and Bluenose were built at the same shipyard. Sherman Zwicker does not have topmasts or a bowsprit. She was built strictly as a working fishing vessel and did not race like Bluenose.

In her heyday, she was part of a fleet of hundreds of wooden schooners that fished the abundant but turbulent Grand Banks region of the North Atlantic. Less than five of her fleet remain in the world today, and the Sherman Zwicker is the only that is fully operational and fully restored.

History

Owned by Zwicker and Co., Sherman Zwicker was built to fish the Grand Banks of Newfoundland from dories from the ports of Lunenburg, Nova Scotia. When it became too difficult to fill all 11 dories with crew, she fished from the port of Glovertown, Newfoundland (1959–1968). In 1959 she fished eight dories with a crew of 18, all from Newfoundland. Before ice and refrigeration were available, in order to preserve the fish they caught these schooners would salt their fish. In the 1950s and 1960s fishing trawlers were being built and became more lucrative. The number of Grand Banks schooners greatly declined from approximately a hundred to only fifteen still fishing. In 1963 the political upheaval in Haiti cut off one of the main salt fish markets and this left a huge decrease in the sales for salt fish.

Sherman Zwicker was then sold to George McEvoy of Maine in 1968. His plan was to restore her to her original condition. Today, she is a fully operational traveling museum that visits the Maine Maritime Museum in Bath, Maine, regularly. She frequently participates in tall ship festivities along the Eastern Seaboard and continues to visit her original home port in Nova Scotia and Newfoundland.

Design

Designed by William James Roué, the Sherman Zwicker is a nearly identical twin of Roué’s most famous hull, the Bluenose – widely considered the fastest racing schooner ever built. While the Bluenose split her time between racing and fishing, the Sherman Zwicker’s true purpose was to prolong the working life of the saltbank fleet; therefore, slight modifications were made to her rigging and propulsion to increase efficiency. This left her with the sleek purpose built racing hull of Bluenose, paired with a substantial Fairbanks Morse diesel engine, and a more compact, easier to tend rig. At the time she was a considered a modern transition vessel (vessels transitioning from sails to diesel power), and as such was one of the first and last of a kind. Her keel was laid at the renowned Smith and Rhuland Shipyard in Lunenburg, Nova Scotia where she was built by hand using heavy timbers of old growth Canadian elm. She was indeed the last of a fleet of hundreds of large wooden schooners fishing the Grand Banks and moving cargoes of fish and salt in the North Atlantic to South America.

Present status

Control of the vessel was turned over to the Grand Banks Schooner Museum Trust, a non-profit group headed by Capt. McEvoy. Under the Trust, the Sherman Zwicker became a fully operational, traveling museum, attending many tall ship festivities along the eastern seaboard, and frequently visiting her old ports of call in Nova Scotia and Newfoundland to much fanfare. For almost 30 years, she spent her summers docked at the Maine Maritime Museum in Bath, Maine, where she played host to tens of thousands of visitors each season.

In 2014, the Grand Banks Schooner Museum Trust gifted the Sherman Zwicker to the Maritime Foundation to ensure her preservation for future generations. The Maritime Foundation found her a new home at Hudson River Park’s Pier 25 in New York City, where she is maintained using proceeds from "Grand Banks", an award-winning seasonal oyster bar that operates on her deck.

Gallery

References

External links

 
 
 

1942 ships
Individual sailing vessels
Museum ships in New York (state)
Sailing ships of Canada
Schooners
Ships built in Nova Scotia
Transport in Lunenburg County, Nova Scotia
Floating restaurants